Field Recordings from the Sun is the second studio album from indie/noise rock group Comets on Fire, released in 2002 on Ba Da Bing Records.

Track listing
 "Beneath the Ice Age" - 9:20
 "Return to Heaven" - 6:29
 "The Unicorn" - 3:51
 "ESP" - 6:42
 "The Black Poodle" - 10:22

References

2002 albums
Comets on Fire albums
Ba Da Bing Records albums
Space rock albums